Central Vermont Public Service Corp. (CVPS) was the largest electricity supplier in Vermont. Its customer base covered 160,000 people in 163 towns, villages and cities in Vermont. The company generated revenue mainly though purchased electricity through its subsidiaries including C.V. Realty, Inc., East Barnet Hydroelectric, Inc., and Catamount Resources Corp.

History
In 1929, the company was founded by combining eight Vermont electric companies. The creator was Samuel Insull. The company was among the first companies to successfully use wind to generate electricity and organized Yankee Atomic Electric Company to make a trial in atomic power.

In 1990s and 2000s, CVPS struggled to maintain profitability  and was acquired by Quebec's Gaz Métro on June 27, 2012, merging into its Green Mountain Power subsidiary through Gaz Métro's American operations, Northern New England Energy Corporation. Gaz Métro purchased CVPS for $472 million, outbidding another Canadian company who sought CVPS, Fortis Inc.

References
Notes

External links
 Green Mountain Power
 Northern New England Energy

Electric power companies of the United States
American companies established in 1929
Energy companies established in 1929
Non-renewable resource companies established in 1929
Non-renewable resource companies disestablished in 2012
2012 mergers and acquisitions